Chinese Tartary is an archaic geographical term used especially during the time of the Qing dynasty. The term "Tartar" was used by Europeans to refer to ethnicities living in northern, northeastern, and western China, including the Mongols, Manchus, Tibetans, and Central Asians. Some definitions include the Japanese (as indicated in violet on the map below).

History of the term
Early European writers used the term "Tartar" indiscriminately for all the peoples of Northern Eurasia and referred to their lands as "Tartary". By the seventeenth century, however, largely under the influence of Catholic missionary writings, the word "Tartar" came to refer to the Manchus, and the land they ruled as "Tartary." The term "Chinese Tartary" was used as early as 1734 on a map created by the French geographer and cartographer Jean Baptiste Bourguignon d'Anville (1697–1782), who published the map in the Nouvel atlas de la Chine, de la Tartarie Chinoise et du Thibet (New atlas of China, Chinese Tartary, and Tibet) in 1738.

D'Anville's map was based on work ordered by the Emperor of China and conducted by the Chinese under the supervision of Jesuits. Also published in 1738 was A description of the empire of China and Chinese-Tartary together with the kingdoms of Korea, and Tibet by Jean-Baptiste Du Halde. In 1741, he went on to write The General History of China Containing a Geographical, Historical, Chronological, Political and Physical Description of the Empire of China, Chinese-Tartary, Corea and Thibet.

Modern areas
The areas described by this work as falling within Chinese Tartary included:
 Xinjiang
 Mongolia (Inner Mongolia and Outer Mongolia)
 Manchuria
 Qinghai

In 1832, the geographical boundaries of Chinese Tartary were defined in A Geographical Dictionary Or Universal Gazetteer.

By 1867, the area of Chinese Tartary was described as the three vast areas covering Manchuria, Mongolia, and Ili (Xinjiang).

Further reading
 "Chinese Tartary", The Asiatic journal and monthly register for British and foreign India, China and Australasia, Volume 20. Allen, 1836. p. 292.

References

Regions of China
Geography of Asia